Te Kōpuru is the largest community on the Pouto Peninsula in Northland, New Zealand. The Wairoa River separates the peninsula at this point from the main North Auckland Peninsula to the east.

History and culture

Pre-European history

The area was initially occupied by Ngāti Awa, but the Ngāti Whātua displaced them in the late 17th or early 18th century. During the Musket Wars of the early 19th century, fighting between Ngā Puhi and Ngāti Whātua and the effects of influenza substantially depopulated the area.

European settlement

In 1841, a skull found in a Pakeha farmer's store at Mangawhare infuriated local Māori, who enacted “Muru” by attacking and plundering his store. A court exonerated the farmer and the perpetrators of the “Muru” ceded the land at Te Kōpuru as compensation. The perpetrators had no interests or rights in the land. A hui held at Te Kōpuru in 1860 to make peace between Ngāti Whātua and Ngā Puhi was attended by about 600 people.

An attempt to set up a kauri sawmill at Te Kōpuru began in 1867, but the machinery was damaged because the ship was leaky, and the owners refused its delivery. In 1870 a mill engineer, B C Massey, was looking for work. It seems he built the mill, completed in 1870. It began operating the following year. The mill was the largest in New Zealand, producing  of timber per week in 1875. It was destroyed by fire in 1883, but rebuilt, and rebuilt again after another fire in 1906 The town had a stable population of about 215 by the end of the decade. By 1876, the town had stores which were "fitted up in first-rate style, and [were] well-stocked" and a library, but no hotel. A Post Office opened in 1877. In 1878, the town was described as like the "port of some thriving inland city". A steamer service provided transport to Dargaville and Helensville twice a week from February 1878, and a road to Dargaville opened in 1879.

20th century

The population increased to 440 during the 1890s as the timber industry grew. A road was built south to Tikinui in 1897, and partially metalled the following year. A library was built in 1899. Gum-diggers were active in the area in the 1890s through at least 1910, and around the turn of the century W Brown and Sons established a boat building yard at Te Kōpuru. Dairy herds became established in the early 20th century, In 1903, the Customs Office was moved to Te Kōpuru from Pouto. A hospital was built to treat the accident victims from Te Kōpuru, Aratapu and Tatarariki, with Te Kōpuru as the hospital site rather than Dargaville because the mill towns had a larger population.

The first sealed road in the Kaipara District was probably the one from Te Kōpuru to Mount Wesley, just south of Dargaville, in about 1918. The mill closed in 1920. Having a hospital sustained the town. The road north degraded to a metalled road by the 1930s. In 1956, the general wards of Te Kopuru Hospital moved to the new hospital in Dargaville. Maternity and services for the elderly continued, although the main hospital building burned down in 1959. In 1971, the hospital closed with maternity services moved to the Dargaville Hospital.

A ferry service was established in 1934 running from Raupo (on the eastern shore of the Northern Wairoa) to Tikinui (just south of Te Kōpuru). The service was initially established to transport milk from dairy farms on the Pouto Peninsula to the dairy factory located in Ruawai, but many travelers to the peninsula found using the ferry service preferable to driving through Dargaville (currently a 35-minute journey but far longer on the metalled and windy roads of the time). This was particularly true during the Toheroa season (now illegal to harvest as the population has not recovered from over exploitation in the 1950s and 1960s) when families would come from all over the country to harvest the shellfish, found on the west coast beaches of Northland, that many thought of as a delicacy. Improved road conditions and the establishment of a railway line led to the service being discontinued around 1971.

Marae

Some Ngāti Whātua marae are located in or around Te Kōpuru. Ōtūrei Marae and Rangimārie Te Aroha meeting house are affiliated with Te Uri o Hau and Te Popoto. The Waikāretu or Pōuto Marae and Rīpia marae sites are also connected with Te Uri o Hau.

Demographics
Te Kōpuru is part of the larger Kaipara Coastal statistical area.

Te Kōpuru had a population of 501 at the 2018 New Zealand census, an increase of 36 people (7.7%) since the 2013 census, and an increase of 45 people (9.9%) since the 2006 census. There were 171 households, comprising 252 males and 249 females, giving a sex ratio of 1.01 males per female, with 117 people (23.4%) aged under 15 years, 75 (15.0%) aged 15 to 29, 213 (42.5%) aged 30 to 64, and 87 (17.4%) aged 65 or older.

Ethnicities were 68.3% European/Pākehā, 47.9% Māori, 4.8% Pacific peoples, 3.0% Asian, and 2.4% other ethnicities. People may identify with more than one ethnicity.

Although some people chose not to answer the census's question about religious affiliation, 52.1% had no religion, 31.1% were Christian, 4.8% had Māori religious beliefs, 0.6% were Hindu, 1.2% were Buddhist and 2.4% had other religions.

Of those at least 15 years old, 21 (5.5%) people had a bachelor's or higher degree, and 126 (32.8%) people had no formal qualifications. 15 people (3.9%) earned over $70,000 compared to 17.2% nationally. The employment status of those at least 15 was that 129 (33.6%) people were employed full-time, 54 (14.1%) were part-time, and 18 (4.7%) were unemployed.

Notable people 

Eddie Dunn (All Black – rugby player)
Ian Dunn (All Black – rugby player)
John Carter, politician
Jane Goulding, hockey player
Warwick Henderson, art gallery curator
Ross Meurant, politician and policeman
Clem Simich, politician
Kendrick Smithyman, poet
Lawrence Weathers, Victoria Cross recipient
Clifton Webb, politician
Lana Searle, Radio Announcer

Education

Te Kōpuru School is a coeducational full primary (years 1–8) school  with a roll of  students as of  The school was founded in 1872. In 1937, the primary schools in Tikinui, Tatarariki and Redhill consolidated into Te Kōpuru School.

Aratapu District High School, a little to the north of Te Kōpuru, closed in 1965. The nearest secondary school is now in Dargaville.

Notes

External links
Welcome to Te Kopuru
Te Kopuru in the Cyclopedia of New Zealand, 1902

Kaipara District
Populated places in the Northland Region